Fairvue or Fairview is a historic farmhouse and farm property in Jefferson County, Tennessee, near Jefferson City.

The house was built in 1850 in a Roman Classical Revival style by its owner, Stokeley Donelson Williams. The name Fairvue was chosen to describe the property's setting, which provides an expansive view of farmland and mountains.

In 1894, the farm was sold to Carrie James. It has remained in the family ever since, and is designated a century farm. Agricultural activities on the  farm include production of beef cattle, hay, wheat, and corn. The house was listed on the National Register of Historic Places in 1982.

References

Houses on the National Register of Historic Places in Tennessee
Houses completed in 1850
Houses in Jefferson County, Tennessee
Century farms
National Register of Historic Places in Jefferson County, Tennessee
1850 establishments in Tennessee